Mehmoodabad  or Mahmudabad is a neighborhood in Karachi East district of Karachi, Pakistan. It was previously administered as part of Jamshed Town, which was disbanded in 2011.

See also 
 Akhtar Colony
 Azam Basti
 Central Jacob Lines
 Chanesar Goth
 Defence View
 Garden East
 Garden West
 Jamshed Quarters
 Jut Line
 Jamshed Town
 Manzoor Colony
 Nursery 
 P.E.C.H.S. (Pakistan Employees Co-operative Housing Society) 
 P.E.C.H.S. II (Pakistan Employees Co-operative Housing Society)  
 Soldier Bazaar

References

External links 
 Karachi Website.

Neighbourhoods of Karachi
Jamshed Town